The following list of Carnegie libraries in Tennessee provides detailed information on United States Carnegie libraries in Tennessee, where 12 free public libraries were built from nine grants (totaling $310,500) awarded by the Carnegie Corporation of New York from 1900 to 1917. In addition, a public library was constructed at a federally owned veteran's hospital, and seven academic libraries were built at academic institutions (totaling $295,000). Tennesseans rejected several proposed Carnegie libraries, including one in 1889 at Johnson City, his first library offer in the U.S. outside Pennsylvania. Other towns that rejected Carnegie libraries included Cleveland, Columbia, Franklin, and Chattanooga (for an African-American branch).  For various reasons, Carnegie also refused requests for libraries at Sparta, Knoxville, Clarksville, Martin, and Maryville College.  Nevertheless, by 1919, Carnegie built twenty library building in Tennessee, including more academic and African-American libraries than any other southern state.  Moreover, Carnegie authorized the single largest grant for an academic library on an American university campus in Tennessee. In total, Tennessee ranked fourth in the South in the total number of Carnegie libraries, lagging behind only Texas, Georgia, and Kentucky.

Tennessee's twenty Carnegie libraries were groundbreaking civic spaces, whether located in small towns, large cities, or university campuses.  Designed by professional architects, these public facilities were intended to be more than book halls and reading rooms; rather, Tennesseans wanted their Carnegie libraries to serve as community centers, even as "Universities of the People," where men, women, and children of all races and classes could be enlightened, educated, or entertained. Carnegie's free library program was a crucial component of the southern Progressives' mantra that good roads, good schools, and good libraries would build a better New South.

Key

Public libraries

Academic libraries

Notes

References

Jones, Robbie D. (2002). "What's in a Name? Tennessee's Carnegie Libraries & Civic Reform in the New South, 1889-1919."  Master's Thesis, Middle Tennessee State University.

Note: The above references, while all authoritative, are not entirely mutually consistent. Some details of this list may have been drawn from one of the references without support from the others.  Reader discretion is advised.

Tennessee
Libraries
 
Libraries